The Trade Council of Denmark, Taipei   represents interests of Denmark in Taiwan in the absence of formal diplomatic relations, functioning as a de facto embassy. Its counterpart in Denmark is the Taipei Representative Office in Denmark in Copenhagen. 

It was established in 1983 as the Danish Trade Organisations' Taipei Office.
 
The Trade Council’s Taipei office provides consular services to Danish citizens in Taiwan, including the issuing of Danish passports. In addition, it is responsible for the issuing of visas for Denmark, Norway and Iceland. It also handles Norwegian passport applications on behalf of the Norwegian Embassy in Singapore. Norway previously had its own Norwegian Trade Council office in Taipei, but this was closed in 2004.
 
The Office is headed by the Director, Nicholas Enersen.

See also
 Denmark–Taiwan relations
 List of diplomatic missions in Taiwan
 List of diplomatic missions of Denmark

References

External links

1983 establishments in Taiwan
Denmark
Taipei
Organizations established in 1983